Dynamic device mapping is a technology for USB KVM switches which is sometimes implemented as an alternative to standard USB keyboard and mouse emulation. Reverse DDM (short for Dynamic Device Mapping), on the other hand, is a related technology that allows further flexibility in regard to specific USB ports.

Design
With DDM (Dynamic Device Mapping) Technology, the communication between shared peripherals and all connected systems are maintained 100% of the time, even as a user switches between the KVM ports.  This makes generic device emulation unnecessary as the DDM allows each connected computer system to believe all connected I/O devices are remaining connected even as the KVM switch might move to another port.

With Reverse DDM, an administrator can provide port level management control.  Individual USB ports can be limited, configured, or assigned to specific kinds of devices.  This adds a level of security in certain environments that require no USB thumb drives to be used, or printers connected, etc.

See also
Dynamic Device Mapping
KVM switch
Display data channel

Computer peripherals